"¡30-30!" was a Mexican artists' group of revolutionary anti-academic painters, that took its name from the .30-30 Winchester rifle. The group existed from 1928 to 1930, and had around about 30 members. They published five manifestos and a journal in three issues.

Notable treintatreintistas 
 Ramón Alva de la Canal (1892–1985)
 Gabriel Fernández Ledesma (1900–1983)
 Fernando Leal (1896–1964)
 Fermín Revueltas (1901–1935)
 Rafael Vera de Córdova
 Martí Casanovas
 Erasto Cortéz Juarez

Literature 
 30-30! contra la Academia de Pintura, 1928 (Spanish), Museo Nacional de Arte, 1993

References 

Mexican artist groups and collectives
1928 in Mexico
History of Mexico City